Visor från vinden (Songs from the loft) is the Swedish singer Sofia Karlsson's third studio album as a solo artist. The album was released on 11 April 2007 by Bonnier Amigo Music Group.

The album is a collection of songs written by poets and musicians from the 18th, 19th, and 20th centuries, including the Swedish Dan Andersson, Marianne Flodin, Mikael Wiehe, Alf Hambe, Carl Michael Bellman, Peps Persson, and Evert Taube. The album contains two poems from Charles Baudelaire, and a version of Boris Vian's antiwar song "Le Déserteur", all three originally French. Two of the songs are translations of Norwegian folk songs.

Visor från vinden was recorded at six different times in different places in Sweden and Denmark. The producers were Göran Petersson, Sofia Karlsson and Jan Borges, and among the participating musicians were Esbjörn Hazelius, Roger Tallroth and Lena Willemark.

The album had a mixed to positive reception, with reviewers commenting on the quality of the performances of traditional songs, interpreted plainly but personally. Visor från vinden reached second place on the Swedish album chart, Karlsson's highest placement. In 2008, she received a Swedish Grammis, a Danish Music Award in the category "Best Foreign Album", and the  Prize in the folk music category.

Background 
Visor från vinden followed Karlsson's 2005 hit Svarta ballader (Black Ballads, from a 1917 book of poems by the Swedish proletarian school author Dan Andersson) which sold 60,000 copies. Karlsson said that after Svarta ballader she had not planned to make a new album for five years. During the tour that followed the album she and her band began to incorporate more and more songs in the repertoire, so many that she finally had enough for a new album. The songs Karlsson chose to include were among her band's favourites that they had been playing on the tour bus.

Production 

Visor från vinden was recorded on six different occasions. "Balladen om briggen "Blue Bird" av Hull" and "Två tungor" were recorded live at Tønder Gymnasium in Tønder, Denmark on 28 August 2006. Jan Borges was producer and Torben Laursen the recording engineer. The songs were recorded for Radio Denmark. The second session was in September 2006, for "Milrök", at Toftaholms manor. The song was recorded by Mats Andersson. The third recording session was in December 2006 and January 2007 in Atlantis Studio, recording "Le Vin Des Amants", "Frukostrast på en liten syfabrik på landet", "Flickan och kråkan", "Spelar för livet", "Jag står här på ett torg", "Resan till Österlandet", "Märk hur vår skugga" and "Moesta et Errabunda". The songs were recorded by Janne Hansson. The fourth and fifth sessions took place in February 2007. "Näckaspel" and "Jag längtar" were recorded by Esbjörn Hazelius in Niglahol Studios, and "Valsen till mig" in Studio Atlantis by Olle Linder. The sixth and last session was in March 2007, for "Hemlängtan", recorded by Olle Linder at Studio Epidemin. 

The album was mixed in three months in three different places: in the Atlantis studio 1 and 2 by Janne Hansson, Mikael Herrström, Pontus Olsson, Göran Peterson, Sofia Karlsson and Esbjörn Hazelius; in Fantasifoster Studios by Olle Linder; and in CPR Recording by Claes Persson, who also mastered the album.

Tracks 

The album begins and ends (apart from the bonus track "Andra sidan") with poems translated from the French Charles Baudelaire. One other track is also a translation of a French song: Boris Vian's antiwar ballad "Le Déserteur". Most of the rest are Swedish songs, though two are translated from Norwegian. The album is a mix of poems and songs from the 18th, 19th, and 20th centuries.

Musicians

 Nils Berg – bass clarinet
 Henrik Cederblom – dobro
  – cittern, violin, viola, guitar, bouzuki, voice
 Sara Isaksson –  voice, Wurlitzer
 Sofia Karlsson – voice, Hammond B3, harmonium, flute, piccolo, bouzouki
 Olle Linder – contrabass, percussion, voice
 Sofie Livebrant – piano
 Peter Lysell – contrabass
 Lisa Rydberg – violin
 Roger Tallroth – tenor guitar, guitar, voice
 Lena Willemark – voice

Reception 

Visor från vinden had a mixed to positive reception, with an average score of 3.4/5 on review aggregator Kritiker.se, based on fifteen reviews. Among the more negative reviewers was Aftonbladets Jonna Sima. She called the music "traditional" and "stylish" but "dull in comparison with song interpreters like Cornelis Vreeswijk." Expressen reviewer Anders Dahlbom wrote that the album felt like a logical follow-on from the 2005 "Svarta Ballader". In his view, Karlsson gave new life to poems and songs by Dan Andersson, Wiehe, Peps, Taube, and others. He found Karlsson's "detailed traditional folk sounds strangely timeless", predicting it would be a success.

Among the more positive reviewers was Dagens Industris Jan Gradvall. He commented that Karlsson had "honed her artistry to perfection", and compared her to the 1960s troubadours Fred Åkerström and Cornelis Vreeswijk.  Norran reviewer Olle Lundqvist felt that she was "one of the new millennium's musical exclamation marks", and predicted that audiences would continue to be excited by Karlsson's work. In his view, the singing and the interpretations of the songs were "straight, yet personal". He found "nothing ingratiating, but plenty of individuality and integrity. This is song with style and soul." Sundsvalls Tidning reviewer Per-Roger Carlsson wrote that the album was more varied than Svarta ballader, but that Karlsson "lives on her expression and is firmly rooted in song. No experiment and improvisation, but with song tradition as her fixed point." He called the album "Fine vocal art from a great vocal artist." 

Svenska Dagbladets reviewer Ingrid Strömdahl noted the choice of two poems by Baudelaire, in particular as translated by Dan Andersson, and their settings by Sofie Livebrant. She found the version of Taube's brig Bluebird "heart-stopping". She noted that the songs were diverse, from Bellman to Wiehe, but felt that they were sung "sensitively and with lovely ornamentation to the varied orchestration." Östgöta Correspondenten found the performances "absolutely perfect", commenting that "the piano and the wind instruments are unbalanced so that it is not only beautiful, but a touch bitter, too."

Awards 

Visor från vinden has won several prizes. In 2008, Karlsson received the Swedish Grammis in the category "folk music/song", and the Danish Music Award in the category "Best foreign albums". In the  the same year, Visor från vinden won the prize in the category "Folk music/song". The jury called it a "folk song so intensely present that everything seems born in the moment" with "a musicality both rooted in folk music tradition and timelessly modern."

Charts
Visor från vinden reached second on the Swedish album chart, Karlsson's best list placement, shared by her 2014 album . The album stayed in the chart for 37 weeks (April 2007-March 2008).

References 

2007 albums
Sofia Karlsson (singer) albums